Edward Akrout is a Franco-British artist and actor.

Early life and education
Born in Paris, Akrout grew up between France and England.  He studied philosophy at the Sorbonne before attending Le Cours Florent in Paris for theatre, followed by time at the National Institute in Bucharest. He lives between London, New York and Paris.

Akrout moved to England where he studied acting at the London Academy of Music and Dramatic Art (LAMDA). Since graduating in 2008, Akrout has been prominent on both the screen and the stage.

He is the grandson of Air Commodore Anthony Norman Davis (14 August 1918 – 1988) a British Royal Air Force officer who served as a pilot during the Second World War.

Career
Akrout is best known for his role as The Dauphin in The Hollow Crown. Other notable roles include Yves D'Allegre in The Borgias, Laurent Debienne in Genius Picasso, Diego in Killing Eve and Edward Steichen in Rodin directed by Jacques Doillon.

Selected filmography
 The Enemy Within (2019) as Aslan Aksoy
 Dark Heart (2018) as Paulo
 Genius (2018) as Laurent Debienne
 Killing Eve (2018) as Diego
 Strangers as Matteo
 Turn: Washington's Spies (2017) as Amos Parker
 Rodin (2017)
 Gypsy (2017)
 Bitter Harvest (2017)
 Houdini & Doyle (2016)
 Midsomer Murders (2016)
 Mr Selfridge (2015)
 Sword of Vengeance (2015)
 The Hollow Crown (2012)
 The Borgias (2011–2012)
 Swinging with the Finkels (2011)

Art
Akrout has had solo exhibitions at The Hoxton (2015), London; Hotel Café Royal (2015), London.

His work has been included in group exhibitions at Metamatic: The Art Foundation (2016), Athens; The Gallery of African Art (2016), London; Le Carreau du Temple (2018), Paris; The Haus der Kulturen der Welt (2018), Berlin.

In 2017, Akrout created the art video Quantum Political Feedback in collaboration with artist, Jakob S. Boeskov. Quantum Political Feedback was in the official selection for Les Rencontres Internationales Paris/Berlin. The film debuted in Paris (12 April 2018)  at Le Carreau du Temple in association with the Pompidou Centre, followed by opening at the festival in Berlin on 21 June 2018 at the venue HKW (Haus der Kulturen der Welt).

Personal life
Akrout is married to journalist Shelby Welinder. The couple provide for charity and had numerous Getty Images taken together in various events.

See also

List of British actors
London Academy of Music and Dramatic Art

References

External links
 IMDb Edward Akrout
 EdwardAkroutArt
 Curtis-Brown/EdwardAkrout 
 Talent-Box/EdwardAkrout
 Major Model

Living people
French male stage actors
British anti–nuclear weapons activists
British male film actors
Male actors from Paris
20th-century French male actors
21st-century French male actors
French male film actors
1982 births
University of Paris alumni
Alumni of the London Academy of Music and Dramatic Art
French male television actors
French anti–nuclear weapons activists
21st-century English male actors
English male film actors
English male musical theatre actors
English male stage actors
English male television actors
English male voice actors
Male actors from London